Rena Niehaus (born 18 December 1954) is a German film actress.

Born in Oldenburg, Rena Niehaus was a minor star in 1970s Italian genre cinema, also appearing in several important "auteur" films as Alberto Lattuada's Cuore di cane and Eriprando Visconti's La Orca and later, Oedipus Orca.

Filmography 
Cuore di cane, directed by Alberto Lattuada (1975)
I baroni, directed by Giampaolo Lomi (1975)
La Orca, directed by Eriprando Visconti (1976)
Oedipus Orca, directed by Eriprando Visconti (1977)
Il maestro di violino, directed by Giovanni Fago (1976)
Un amore targato Forlì, directed by Riccardo Sesani (1976)
Una donna di seconda mano, directed by Pino Tosini (1977)
Nero veneziano, directed by Ugo Liberatore (1978)
Voglia di donna, directed by Franco Bottari (1978)
Ciao cialtroni!, directed by Danilo Massi Rossini (1979)
Arabella l'angelo nero, directed by Stelvio Massi (1989)
Il ritmo del silenzio (1993)

References

External links 
 

1954 births
People from Oldenburg (city)
Living people
German film actresses
20th-century German actresses